Below is the list of subcamps of Gross-Rosen concentration camp, a complex of Nazi concentration camps built and operated by Nazi Germany during World War II. The camps are arranged alphabetically by their Nazi German designation. For the list of present-day locations in alphabetical order, please use table-sort buttons.

The majority of prisoners came from occupied Poland (up to 90% in some subcamps) both Christian and Jewish (usually separated). Most, were put to work as slave labour in textile, armament, mining and defence construction industries. Other nationalities included Czechs, Slovaks, Roma, Belgians, Frenchmen, Russians, Yugoslavs, Hungarians and even ethnically German and Italian inmates. Thousands were brought in from Auschwitz after the selection to work for a network of German companies which ballooned in size during this period; with dozens of subcontractors. The inmates of Dyhernfurth for example, were utilized by almost thirty Nazi German startups.

List of subcamps

See also
List of Nazi-German concentration camps

Notes and references

 List
Gross-Rosen
Gross
Poland history-related lists
Subcamps of Nazi concentration camps

nl:Groß-Rosen#Subkampen